James John Romano (born September 7, 1959) is a former professional American football center in the National Football League. He played six seasons for the Houston Oilers, New England Patriots and Los Angeles Raiders. Jim Romano and wife Brigitte reside in Dallas, Texas, where he is a software industry sales executive.

1959 births
Living people
American football centers
Players of American football from New York (state)
Penn State Nittany Lions football players
Houston Oilers players
Los Angeles Raiders players
Sportspeople from Glen Cove, New York